Michal Juraško (born April 21, 1984) is a Slovak professional ice hockey defenceman who is currently playing for HC Nové Zámky in the Slovak Extraliga.

Career statistics

External links

1984 births
Living people
HC 07 Detva players
HC Nové Zámky players
Slovak ice hockey defencemen
MsHK Žilina players
HKM Zvolen players
Sportspeople from Zvolen
Újpesti TE (ice hockey) players
Expatriate ice hockey players in Hungary
Slovak expatriate ice hockey people
Slovak expatriate sportspeople in Hungary